Simone Motta (born 26 August 1977) is an Italian footballer who last played for Serie D club Tamai.

Motta spent most of his career in Italian lower divisions, scored 85 goals in Lega Pro Prima Divisione; 32 goals in Lega Pro Seconda Divisione and 23 goals in Serie B. (as of 2011–12 season)

Biography

Early career
Born in Udine, Friuli, Motta started his career at Udinese youth team. After a season with Serie C2 team Valdagno, he spent 3 seasons in Serie D. In 1999–2000 Serie D season he scored 17 goals and won a contract from Serie C2 team South Tyrol.

He scored an average of 15 goals a season and left for Serie C1 side Teramo in 2002. He scored a career high of 23 goals and the team entered the promotion playoffs. He scored a goal in the playoff but the team was eliminated after 1–1 draw with Martina and had fewer points in regular season. His goal scoring ability made him earned a transfer to Serie B club Bari.

Bari
In July 2003, he left for Serie B club Bari, in the first season he scored 3 goals only. In 2004–05 Serie B season he lost his starting place and left for fellow Serie B side Ascoli in January 2005, which the team won promotion to Serie A due to Caso Genoa, his greatest achievement so for. He scored a goal for Ascoli, and mainly as a substitute.

In July 2005, he was loaned to newly promoted Serie B club Rimini, which he had to compete with Davide Moscardelli and Sergio Floccari for the strikers role in 4–4–2 formation until Floccari departed in January. That season Rimini finished as the 17th place, just above the teams that entered relegation play-out.

Pistoiese
In 2006, he returned to Serie C1 and scored 18 goals for Pistoiese. In the next season, he scored 10 goals and 3 more goals in relegation playout, made the team secured a place in 2008–09 Lega Pro Prima Divisione by winning Sangiovannese 4–0.

Cesena
In August 2008, he was signed by newly relegated Lega Pro Prima Divisione team Cesena for €142,500 in 2-year contract. He scored 14 league goals with the champion winning side, thus winning a promotion again.

Novara
In 2009, he remained at Prima Divisione, but for Novara, in exchange with Davide Sinigaglia. Motta was valued €720,000 while Sinigaglia for €500,000. Motta signed a 4-year contract. Partnered with Cristian Bertani, they scored 26 goals and Motta contributed 15 of them as team top-scorer, and won promotion to Serie B as champion. In the next season, Pablo Andrés González and Bertani were the starting forward, which Motta moved to midfielder as attacking midfielder in the 4–3–1–2 formation. He made 34 starts in 2010–11 Serie B.

After a loan to Trieste, Motta signed new 2-year contract with Novara as the club relegated from Serie A.

In July 2013 he was released.

Serie D
On 20 September 2013 Motta joined Tamai.

Honours
Lega Pro Prima Divisione: 2009 (Cesena), 2010 (Novara)
Lega Pro Prima Divisione top-scorer (regular season): 2003 (Teramo)

References

External links
 La Gazzetta dello Sport Profile 
 Football.it Profile 
 
 
 Novara Profile 

Italian footballers
Udinese Calcio players
F.C. Südtirol players
S.S. Teramo Calcio players
S.S.C. Bari players
Ascoli Calcio 1898 F.C. players
Rimini F.C. 1912 players
U.S. Pistoiese 1921 players
A.C. Cesena players
Novara F.C. players
U.S. Triestina Calcio 1918 players
Serie B players
Serie C players
Association football forwards
Sportspeople from Udine
1977 births
Living people
Footballers from Friuli Venezia Giulia